The iWombe Anti-Aircraft Regiment (formerly Regiment Oos Transvaal)  is a reserve air defence regiment of the South African Army.

History

Origin
Regiment Oos Transvaal  was established on 1 October 1964. Its first headquarters was a Magistrates Court office in Brakpan in 1968, but by 1975, its headquarters had moved on to Benoni. Renamed Apex Military Base, it was opened officially by Lt Gen Geldenhuys in 1976.

Equipment
Regiment Oos Transvaal was originally meant to be equipped with 35mm Oerlikon but by December 1964, a decision was made that Regiment Oos Transvaal would use Bofors and Oerlikon guns, comprising a Bofors regiment, two 40mm Bofors batteries and a 35mm Oerlikon battery. In 1977 however the Regiment had been equipped as a 20mm anti-aircraft cannon regiment, with six batteries each of 18 guns.

Operations
Regiment Oos Transvaal supplied its R Battery for service in Operation Savannah in January/March 1976 while its P Battery served in the same border area from March to May.

Regiment Oos Transvaal formed part of a reaction force in 1980 but by 1983 forward, members of the Regiment were involved directly in a number of operations such as Operation Prone in 1988.

Present day
Regiment Oos Transvaal is currently equipped with the Oerlikon GDF Mk.5 35mm gun.

Name Change
In August 2019, 52 Reserve Force units had their names changed to reflect the diverse military history of South Africa. Regiment Oos Transvaal became the iWombe Anti-Aircraft Regiment, and have 3 years to design and implement new regimental insignia.

Leadership

Regimental symbols

Previous Dress Insignia

Battle honours
 Operation Savannah (Southern Angola)

Freedom of the city
The Freedom of Brakpan was granted to the Regiment on 14 April 1984.

References

Artillery regiments of South Africa
Military units and formations in Benoni
Military units and formations established in 1964
Artillery units and formations of South Africa
Military units and formations of South Africa in the Border War
Military units and formations of South Africa